The Edgewood Historic District is a U.S. historic district (designated as such on December 18, 1989) located in Venice, Florida. The district is bounded by School Street, Myrtle Avenue, Venice-By-Way, and Groveland Avenue. It contains 36 historic buildings.

Gallery

References

External links

 Sarasota County listings at National Register of Historic Places

National Register of Historic Places in Sarasota County, Florida
Historic districts on the National Register of Historic Places in Florida